Shan is a Chinese surname. The origin of this surname is not clear. One explanation is that it came from Shan County in Shandong province. Another possible origin involves King Cheng of Zhou's youngest son's acquisition of the name when he was given what would become the Shan state when the enfeoffment system was enacted during the Zhou dynasty. The Shan state existed for a few hundred years before it was annexed by a stronger neighbouring state. It was located in present-day Jiyuan, Henan province. Although the surname comes from the place name, the Shan family was a branch of the royal family of the Zhou dynasty. Its ancient origin determines its rareness and not many people have the Shan surname. According to one unverifiable estimate, about 150,000 people are of the surname.

Shan could also be used to refer to the rare surname 𢒉. The rare character was unable to be rendered on a computer so people chose Xian 冼 to replace it. People from  Gaozhuang  Village born after the system change and people who didn't want a hassle with technology were affected. The choice was controversial as some people saw that future generations would forget their name.

Most of people of the Shan surname live in Shandong, Henan and Hebei. However, some people bearing the Shan surname can be found in Taiwan and overseas Chinese communities throughout the world.

Some ethnic peoples adopted "Shan" as their surname but its pronunciation is mostly "Chan". Some Manchu and Hui people choose "Shan" as their family name, but their population is small. Majority of the Shan are Han Chinese and they can trace their origin to the Zhou dynasty.

The character 单/單 is also pronounced  when not a surname.

Notable people with the surname Shan 
 Shan Xiongxin (單雄信; 581–621), a general of the Transition from Sui to Tang period.
 Shan Zhongsheng, who lived in the Yuan dynasty. He is known for his filial piety.
 Pal Sinn (單立文, Shan Liwen; born 1959), a Hong Kong singer and actor.
 Shan Tianfang (單田芳; 1934–2018), a pingshu performer.
 Sin Chung-kai (單仲偕, Shan Zhongkai; born 1960), a Hong Kong politician.
 Sin Wai-chu (單慧珠; Shan Huizhu), a Hong Kong film director.
 Shan Zhiqiang, former editor-in-chief of National Geographic in China.
 Paul Shan Kuo-hsi (單國璽, Shan Guoxi; 1923–2012), a Taiwanese bishop.
 Shan Fuliang, a history professor at the Grand Valley State University and former president of the Chinese Historians in the United States (CHUS).

Fictional characters with the surname 
 Shan Tinggui, a fictional character and one of the 108 heroes in the classical novel Water Margin.
 The Shan family, a fictional family in the Star Wars Legends continuity
Bastila Shan, a Jedi who appears in the Star Wars: Knights of the Old Republic video game duology
Satele Shan, another Jedi and descendant of Bastila, appearing in the MMORPG Star Wars: The Old Republic

References

Chinese-language surnames
Individual Chinese surnames